Melissa Errico (born March 23, 1970) is an American actress, singer, recording artist and writer. She is known for her Broadway musical roles such as Eliza Doolittle in My Fair Lady and the title role in One Touch of Venus, as well as her recordings of musical theater classics, including albums of songs by Stephen Sondheim and Michel Legrand. In recent years she has also become a contributing writer to The New York Times.

Early life
Born in New York City, Errico went to high school in Manhasset while taking dance lessons in Manhattan. Her father is an orthopedic surgeon and concert pianist. Her mother is a former teacher who now works as a sculptor. She began her professional career at 12, appearing on the syndicated children's TV series The Great Space Coaster. Errico's maternal grandmother was an opera singer.

Education

Errico is a graduate of Yale University. During her freshman year, Errico was asked to audition for the role of Cosette while trying out for a different show, and was cast. Errico took a leave of absence from Yale and performed in a tour of Les Misérables, then returned to complete a degree in art history and philosophy. Errico is also a graduate of the British American Drama Academy's 1991 Midsummer in Oxford Programme.

Errico is a guest instructor at HB Studio.

Notable theater roles
Errico played Cosette in Les Misérables on a national tour. She also played Eliza Doolittle in My Fair Lady on Broadway, opposite Richard Chamberlain and Julian Holloway, at the Virginia Theater. She co-starred opposite Tyne Daly in the New York City Center Encores production of Call Me Madam. In 2002, Errico played the role of Dot/Marie in Sunday in the Park with George. The production ran at the Eisenhower Theater at the Kennedy Center in Washington, D.C. from May 31 to June 28, and Errico's work was recognized with a Helen Hayes Award nomination for Leading Actress in a Musical. In 2003 she co-starred in the revival of the Wallace Shawn play Aunt Dan and Lemon at The New Group directed by Scott Ellis. In 2003 Errico also returned to the role of Eliza Doolittle, alongside John Lithgow and Roger Daltrey, for a production of My Fair Lady at the Hollywood Bowl in Los Angeles; she also starred there in Camelot opposite Jeremy Irons and The Sound of Music with Marni Nixon as Mother Abbess. Other Broadway starring roles include High Society, Anna Karenina, Dracula The Musical, Amour, and Irving Berlin's White Christmas. She is the recipient of a Tony Award nomination for Best Leading Actress in a Musical (Michel Legrand's Amour), and a Lucille Lortel Award for Outstanding Lead Actress in One Touch of Venus. In 2013 she co-starred as Clara in the Classic Stage Company production of Stephen Sondheim’s Passion, earning a Drama Desk Award nomination for her performance. In 2016, she returned to the New York City Center stage for the Rodgers-Sondheim musical Do I Hear a Waltz?, for which she won rave reviews. She has also starred in several productions for Irish Repertory Theatre including the musical Finian's Rainbow and her Drama Desk Award-nominated performances in the plays The Importance of Being Earnest and Candida. At age 46, Errico returned to the ingenue role Sharon in the 2016 Irish Repertory Theatre production of Finian's Rainbow, an experience she chronicled in The New York Times; she also starred in their production of On a Clear Day You Can See Forever in 2018, which she also wrote about in The New York Times.

Errico has been recognized as an interpreter of Stephen Sondheim's work, with Terry Teachout of The Wall Street Journal calling her 2018 album Sondheim Sublime "the best all-Sondheim album ever recorded". In 2022, The Wall Street Journal said her new album Out Of The Dark: The Film Noir Project "gives us noir music the way we imagine it...melancholy, bittersweet tales of isolation and loneliness, beauty and betrayal—especially relevant at the height of the Covid-19 pandemic...Ms. Errico sings throughout with a tone at once wistful and probing, suggesting that romance and mystery are but different sides of the same coin...we are breathing along with her, seeing what she sees, feeling what she feels...she makes it “uncommonly clear” that we are all silent partners in our own destruction, and that the most we can hope for is a few brief moments of tenderness".

Television
Errico portrayed Alex Bartoli on Central Park West, and has had roles on episodes of Billions and The Knick.

Errico has also appeared on The Jim Gaffigan Show, Blue Bloods, The Good Wife, Law & Order, A Gifted Man, Ed, and Miss Match opposite Alicia Silverstone.

Film
Errico has had roles in a number of films, including Mockingbird Don't Sing, Frequency, and Life or Something Like It. In 2013, Errico recorded the theme song for the movie Max Rose. The soundtrack features an original score by Michel Legrand, and Errico sang the main title track, "Hurry Home". In 2019, Errico curated a film festival for French Institute Alliance Française in New York City celebrating movies featuring the music of composer Michel Legrand. In 2022, The Wall Street Journal said her new album Out Of The Dark: The Film Noir Project "gives us noir music the way we imagine it...melancholy, bittersweet tales of isolation and loneliness, beauty and betrayal—especially relevant at the height of the Covid-19 pandemic...Ms. Errico sings throughout with a tone at once wistful and probing, suggesting that romance and mystery are but different sides of the same coin...we are breathing along with her, seeing what she sees, feeling what she feels...she makes it “uncommonly clear” that we are all silent partners in our own destruction, and that the most we can hope for is a few brief moments of tenderness".

Recording career

Solo albums
Blue Like That (Manhattan Records/EMI) produced by Arif Mardin – released February 25, 2003
Lullabies & Wildflowers (Velour/Universal Records, later Ghostlight Records) produced by Rob Mathes – released April 29, 2008
Legrand Affair (Ghostlight Records) produced by Phil Ramone – released October 18, 2011
More Lullabies & Wildflowers (Ghostlight Records) – released June 23, 2015
What About Today? Melissa Errico – Live at 54 Below (Broadway Records) – released October 16, 2015
Sondheim Sublime (Ghostlight Records) – released November 2, 2018
Legrand Affair: Deluxe Edition (Ghostlight Records) – released November 8, 2019
Two Spring Songs for Summer – released July 10, 2020
Out of The Dark: The Film Noir Project – released in 2022

Cast albums
Call Me Madam – Encores Cast (1995)
High Society – Original Broadway Cast (1998)
Amour – Original Broadway Cast (2003)
Finian's Rainbow – Irish Repertory Theater Cast Recording (2004)
Sadie Thompson – World Premiere Recording (2005)
Anna Karenina – The Broadway Musical (2007)
One Touch of Venus – First Complete Recording (2014)

Miscellaneous recordings
"Wouldn't It Be Loverly" – The Musicality of Lerner & Loewe.
"The Mockingbird Song" – Mockingbird Don't Sing soundtrack.
"Blue Skies/It's a Lovely Day Today" (duet with Malcolm Gets) – The Journey Home.
"In Love In Vain" from Jerome Kern: Life Upon The Wicked S.T.A.G.E.
"There's a Small Hotel" & "People Will Say We're In Love" (duet with Patrick Quinn) – "Wall to Wall Richard Rodgers".
"Have Yourself a Merry Little Christmas" from Weihnachten with José van Dam.
"Maybe Someone Dreamed Us" from Legrand Affair appears on the Michel Legrand Anthology.
"Otherwise" by Jane Kenyon – "Poetic License" – 100 poems/100 performers, part 3 (available on ITunes).
"Hurry Home" – "Max Rose" Original Film Soundtrack.

Errico's recording of a song from David Shire's new musical Table was aired in April 2015 on NPR radio on The Jonathan Schwartz show for WYNC.

Concerts
She reprised her performance as Venus at City Center Encores! Broadway Bash! in November 2001. Errico made her London debut in May 2008 singing in Jerry Herman's Broadway at the London Palladium. In November 2015, she debuted her new one-woman show at Joe's Pub, New York City, co-written with close collaborator Adam Gopnik. Errico has toured with conductor Marvin Hamlisch. In 2016 she appeared at the David Rubenstein Atrium, Lincoln Center, in a talk by Adam Gopnik about Judy Garland. She also performed at Lincoln Center for their American Songbook Series and at Jazz at Lincoln Center with Michael Feinstein. She has also performed with Feinstein at Carnegie Hall. In 2017 and 2018 she performed runs of her concert of the music of Stephen Sondheim throughout the U.S. and in London and in 2019, she starred as The Baker's Wife in a concert production of Sondheim's Into the Woods in Long Island. In 2019 she performed concerts featuring the music of Michel Legrand at the Fairmont San Francisco and in NYC at Feinstein's/54 Below. She was the sole American performer at the two-day memorial concert for Legrand in April, 2019 at Paris' Grand Rex and she also performed at London's Legrand memorial concert in September, 2019 at Royal Festival Hall. In 2019 she also performed the National Anthem at Arthur Ashe Stadium at the US Open. On March 22, 2020, to celebrate his 90th birthday, Guild Hall of East Hampton premiered her Stephen Sondheim concert on YouTube with an exclusive livestream.

Personal life
She has two siblings – Mike Errico and Melanie Errico. She met her husband, former tennis professional and ESPN sports commentator Patrick McEnroe, when they were in grade school together. They married on December 19, 1998, at the Holy Trinity Church on W. 82nd Street. She lives in New York with their three daughters.

Writing
Errico was a principal speaker at the Annual Broadway Blessing in 2013.

She has penned several columns in The New York Times. These include columns which discuss returning to ingenue roles later in life, her experience as a headliner performer on a themed cruise, gender politics, her time with composer Michel Legrand, the recent trend of home-taping for auditions, the process of digitally rehearsing and producing a full musical production of Meet Me in St. Louis  during the COVID-19 pandemic, a costume fitting for her first live concert since the pandemic began, and an essay about being on the road examining a performer's life, before and after the pandemic. She also wrote an expanded article on her experiences with Legrand, which was published in the French magazine .

She has also written several essays for the wellness/lifestyle magazine The Purist.

Philanthropy
Errico founded the Bowery Babes in 2005 and continues to serve in an advisory capacity. She performed at Merkin Concert Hall in June 2015 to support the Ali Forney Center, which assists homeless LGBT youth. She has supported the arts organization Sing For Hope and non-profit camp SAY, for children who stutter. Errico appeared in Take Me to the World: A Sondheim 90th Birthday Celebration, a fundraiser for Artists Striving To End Poverty (ASTEP) in April 2020.

References

External links

Bowery Babes

1970 births
American women singers
Buckley Country Day School alumni
Living people
Actresses from New York City
People from Manhasset, New York
People from Manhattan
Yale College alumni
Yale School of Drama alumni
Alumni of the British American Drama Academy
American musical theatre actresses